Gully is an 2019 American coming-of-age drama film, directed by Nabil Elderkin, from a screenplay by Marcus J. Guillory. It stars Jacob Latimore, Charlie Plummer, Jonathan Majors, Kelvin Harrison Jr., Amber Heard, and Terrence Howard.

It had its world premiere at the Tribeca Film Festival on April 27, 2019. It was released internationally on June 4, 2021, by Vertical Entertainment.

Plot

Three teens living in LA, all victims of extreme childhoods, wreak a hedonistic riot across the city over the course of 48 hours, unbound by societal norms. They take us on a rip-roaring ride of drugs and murder across Los Angeles.

Cast
 Jacob Latimore as Calvin 
 Charlie Plummer as Nicky
 Jonathan Majors as Greg
 Kelvin Harrison Jr. as Jesse
 Amber Heard as Joyce
 Terrence Howard as Mr. Christmas
 Zoe Renee as Keisha
 Chastity Dotson as Angela
 Chris Gann as Barett
 Kashton Moore as Terry
 John Corbett as Mr. Charlie
 Mo McRae as Otis

American rapper Travis Scott makes a cameo in the film.

Production
In March 2018, it was announced Charlie Plummer, Kelvin Harrison Jr., Jacob Latimore, Alice Eve and Jonathan Majors had joined the cast of the film, with Nabil Elderkin directing from a screenplay by Marcus J. Guillory. Brad Feinstein, Tom Butterfield, Ben Pugh, Corey Smyth and Alex Georgiou will produce the film, while Joseph F. Ingrassia, Gabriela Revilla Lugo, Andy Brunskill, Kweku Mandela and Mattia Bogianchino will executive produce the film, under Feinstein’s Romulus Entertainment banner. That same month, Amber Heard joined the cast of the film.

Filming
Principal photography began in March 2018.

Soundtrack

Gully (Original Motion Picture Soundtrack) is the soundtrack to the 2019 film Gully that was released on June 4, 2021 by Epic Records and Sony Music Entertainment. The album contains performances by 21 Savage, Ty Dolla $ign, ScHoolboy Q, B-Real, Don Toliver, Miguel, Snoh Aalegra, Gary Clark Jr., Sleepy Rose, Mike Will Made-It, 2 Chainz, and Dua Lipa. A song by Travis Scott titled "Knife" was originally meant to appear on the soundtrack but was cut due to sampling issues, however, a snippet of the song is played during the film.

Track listing

Release
The film had its world premiere at the Tribeca Film Festival on April 27, 2019. In September 2020, Vertical Entertainment and Paramount Pictures acquired U.S. distribution rights to the film.

On May 21, 2021, Paramount Pictures released a trailer for the film. It was released internationally on June 4, 2021.

References

External links
 

2019 films
American coming-of-age drama films
2010s coming-of-age drama films
Vertical Entertainment films
Paramount Pictures films
Films about pedophilia
2010s English-language films
2010s American films